Hasan Abdal Railway Station (Urdu and ) is located in Hasan Abdal town, Attock district of Punjab province, Pakistan.

Renovation 
Established in 1839, the British-era railway station has been renovated and reconstructed after 127 years.

See also
 List of railway stations in Pakistan
 Pakistan Railways
Hasan Abdal
Gurdwara Panja Sahib

References

External links

Railway stations in Attock District
Railway stations on Karachi–Peshawar Line (ML 1)